Akkarai Pachai is a 1974 Indian Tamil-language film directed by N. Venkatesh and written by A. S. Prakasam. The film stars Jaishankar, Ravichandran, Nagesh, Lakshmi and Jayachitra. It was released on 19 September 1974.

Plot 

There are two educated women. Both continuously tend to find fault with their respective husbands, threatening their marriage.

Cast 
 Jaishankar
 Ravichandran
 Nagesh
 Lakshmi
 Jayachitra
 Savitri
 Rajasree

Soundtrack 
The music was composed by M. S. Viswanathan, with lyrics by Kannadasan. The song "Ikkaraikku Akkarai Pachai" attained popularity.

Release and reception 
Akkarai Pachai was released on 19 September 1974. Kalki felt that, by not focusing on character development, the screenplay ruined itself, but praised the performances of the lead cast, and Prakasam's dialogues.

References

External links 
 

1970s Tamil-language films
Films scored by M. S. Viswanathan